Alfredo Robert (1877–1964) was an Italian actor and film director.

Selected filmography
 Il sire di Vincigliata (1913)
 The Doctor's Secret (1931)
 Paradise (1932)
 Doctor Antonio (1937)
 Pietro Micca (1938)
 It Always Ends That Way (1939)
The King of England Will Not Pay (1941)
 Don Cesare di Bazan (1942)
 Pact with the Devil (1950)

References

Bibliography 
 Waldman, Harry. Missing Reels: Lost Films of American and European Cinema. McFarland, 2000.

External links 
 

1877 births
1964 deaths
People from Fucecchio
Italian male film actors
Italian film directors